Tabriz Khalil Rza oglu Khalilbeyli (12 February 1964, Baku, Azerbaijan – 31 January 1992, Nakhichevanik) was the National Hero of Azerbaijan, and warrior of the First Nagorno-Karabakh War.

Early life and education 
Khalilbeyli was born on February 12, 1964, in Baku, Azerbaijan SSR. In 1981, he completed his secondary education at the school No. 18 named after Mikayil Mushfig. In 1982, he entered Azerbaijan State University of Culture and Arts. Following his graduation, Khalilbeyli started to work at Azerbaijanfilm cinema studio named after J. Jabbarli. 

Khalilbeyli was married and had two daughters.

Nagorno-Karabakh war 
When the First Nagorno-Karabakh War started, Khalilbeyli voluntarily enlisted in the Azerbaijani Army and went to the front-line. He participated in all battles around the villages of Khromord and Nakhichevanik. Tabriz Khalilbeyli was awarded the title of "Gray wolf" of The Ministry of Internal Affairs of Azerbaijan for his participation in the battles.

Khalilbeyli died in the Dashalty operation carried out by the Azerbaijani Army to regain the Dashalty village from Armenian armed units.

Honors 
Tabriz Khalilbeyli was buried at a Martyrs' Lane cemetery in Baku. He was posthumously awarded the title of the National Hero of Azerbaijan by the decree of the Azerbaijani President dated October 8, 1992.

One of the streets in Baku and Salyan District, and the ship used for special service were named after him.

References

Sources 
 Vugar Asgarov. Azərbaycanın Milli Qəhrəmanları (Yenidən işlənmiş II nəşr). Bakı: "Dərələyəz-M", 2010, səh. 131.

See also 
 First Nagorno-Karabakh War
 National Hero of Azerbaijan

1964 births
1992 deaths
Military personnel from Baku
Azerbaijani military personnel of the Nagorno-Karabakh War
Azerbaijani military personnel killed in action
National Heroes of Azerbaijan